The Ebell Club of Santa Paula is a 1917 mansion, built as a women's club with the aim of the advancement of culture, and now serving as the home of the Santa Paula Theater Center. The Santa Paula chapter, formed in 1913, was the ninth California women's club; the first was established in Oakland by Adrian Ebell in 1876, and the movement was involved in a range of progressive campaigning on social issues.

The building, at 125 S. Seventh Street, was designed by Hunt & Burns and built by contractor William A. Hudson. The clubhouse is in Bungalow/Craftsman style. It is surrounded by a park in English landscape garden style that was part of the original design for the club. Alice Stowell McKevett donated land for Ebell Park and contracted the first half of the building in memory of her husband. The dining room and kitchen were added in 1928 by Harriet McKevett Teague and the McKevett Corporation. In 1987 the McKevett Corporation deeded the building to the Santa Paula Community Fund, who in turn deeded it to the Santa Paula Theater Center. For several years the club and the thespians shared the space but the ladies have since parted to a space rented by the First United Methodist Church.

The property was listed on the National Register of Historic Places in 1989. Its NRHP nomination asserted it is "an outstanding example of
the shingled Craftsman style", and the "only example of its type in Santa Paula where a Craftsman era institutional building was designed with a complementary landscape plan." It is also one of few preserved historic clubhouses in Ventura County and is the only women's clubhouse in Santa Paula.

See also
 Ebell of Los Angeles
 Ebell Society
 Women's Improvement Club of Hueneme
 National Register of Historic Places listings in Ventura County, California
 Ventura County Historic Landmarks & Points of Interest

References

External links

 Santa Paula Theater Center

Women's club buildings in California
Santa Paula, California
Buildings and structures in Santa Paula, California
Theatres in California
Clubs and societies in California
Women's clubs in the United States
Clubhouses on the National Register of Historic Places in California
National Register of Historic Places in Ventura County, California
Buildings and structures completed in 1917
History of women in California